The Apostle is a 2012 Spanish stop-motion animated fantasy horror film written and directed by  (in his directorial debut). Produced by Artefact Productions, it stars Carlos Blanco Vila, Paul Naschy, Jorge Sanz, Geraldine Chaplin and Luis Tosar. It was the last film starring Naschy, who died in November 2009. Released in Spanish cinemas on 31 October 2012 by Film Arante and Coven Distribution, the film was a box office bomb, grossing $59,810 against a budget of €5.2 million.

Premise 
A recently escaped convict seeks to recover a treasure he hid years ago in a small, secluded Galician village. However once there, he finds out that in the village there is an even worse sentence than the one he fled from.

Voice cast 
The Spanish voice cast is as follows:
Carlos Blanco Vila as Ramon
Paul Naschy as the Archpriest of Santiago
Jorge Sanz as Pablo
Geraldine Chaplin as Dorinda
Luis Tosar as Xavier
Xosé Manuel Olveira as Don Cesareo
Celso Bugallo as Celso
Manuel Manquina as Atilano
Isabel Blanco as Pilgrim

Production 
Production began in 2008. With a budget of €5.2 million, The Apostle was partially crowdfunded by 560 backers. It was filmed in stereoscopic stop-motion using clay animation being the first one made in Europe. Written and directed by Fernando Cortizo, the film was Cortizo's directorial debut. The cinematography was handled by Matthew Hazelrig, and the film was edited by Fernando Alfonsin. The soundtrack was composed by Xavier Font, Philip Glass and Arturo Vaquero, and released by Orange Mountain Music.

Release

Box office 
The Apostle was released theatrically in Spain on 31 October 2012. Although a release of 80 theatres was originally agreed upon by distributors Film Arante and Coven Distribution, The Apostle would ultimately be released in only thirteen theatres following various setbacks. A box office flop, the film grossed $17,061	in its opening weekend for a total box office gross of $59,810 during its entire theatrical run. The financial loss was so substantial that it brought Artefact Productions to the brink of bankruptcy. After the disappointing release, director Coritzo told Fotogramas "in Spain, I will never make a film again. I have wasted 3 years of my life for nothing, and the efforts of many people have been wasted."

Home media 
In November 2014, The Apostle was released on its official website by Artefact Productions at a cost of €1.5 for a 24-hour renting period. Multiple subtitled versions were also available, including English. The DVD was priced at €10. Due to Artefact Productions's previous interactions with Film Arante and Coven Distribution, they do not intend to sell the film to a video streaming service or DVD distributor, rather selling online via their official website.

Accolades 
At the 27th Goya Awards, The Apostle was nominated for Best Animated Film, but lost to Tad, The Lost Explorer.

References

External links 
 (in Spanish)
Official channel of the Director on YouTube (full film available for free, Castilian/Spanish and Galician audio, subtitles available in several languages)

2012 animated films
2010s Spanish films
2010s Spanish-language films
Galician-language films
Spanish animated fantasy films
Animated horror films
Films set in Galicia (Spain)